HNLMS Schorpioen is a  monitor built in France for the Royal Netherlands Navy in the 1860s. These new ships were equipped with heavy rifled  guns, and a heavy armor.

Her striking weapon was the pointed ram bow, slightly different from Buffels, but she never ever used this overestimated weapon.

Service record 

As with Buffel, her record is not very impressive. In 1886 Schorpioen was hit in the stern quarter by a paddle steam tugboat in the harbor of Den Helder and sank in two hours. It was possible to raise and repair her. In 1906 she completed her role as an operational warship and was transformed into an accommodation ship.

At the beginning of World War II, she fell into German hands, was towed to Germany, and served there as a lodging - and storage ship. After the war, in 1947 she was found in Hamburg, Germany and towed back to Den Helder; again to become a lodging ship, first in Amsterdam and later in Den Helder where she became the barracks for the Dutch WRNS. In 1982, after decommissioning, she was bought by a private foundation that was established to transform her into a floating museum in Middelburg, in the southern part of the country. Seven years later, after a complete renovation, she opened her doors to visitors, as a museum ship.

In 1995, the Royal Netherlands Navy re-acquired the ship and put her under the supervision of the Dutch Navy Museum in Den Helder where she is now the third, and largest, vessel on display. In May 2000, after a renovation period of eighteen months to restore her to her former glory, the ship was opened to visitors.

See also
 List of museum ships

Notes

References

External links

 Photo-collection on Dutch ironclads
  HMLMS Schorpioen at Dutch Naval Museum
 HNSA Ship Page: HMLMS Schorpioen

19th-century naval ships of the Netherlands
Naval ships of the Netherlands captured by Germany during World War II
Museum ships in the Netherlands
1868 ships
Schorpioen-class monitors
Ships built in France